2709 Sagan, provisional designation , is a stony Florian asteroid from the inner regions of the asteroid belt, approximately 6.7 kilometers in diameter. It was discovered on 21 March 1982, by American astronomer Edward Bowell at Lowell's Anderson Mesa Station near Flagstaff, Arizona, and named after astronomer and science popularizer Carl Sagan.

Orbit and classification 

Sagan is a member of the Flora family, one of the largest families of stony asteroids. It orbits the Sun in the inner main-belt at a distance of 2.0–2.3 AU once every 3 years and 3 months (1,188 days). Its orbit has an eccentricity of 0.07 and an inclination of 3° with respect to the ecliptic.

Physical characteristics 

In the SMASS classification, Sagan is classified as a S-type asteroid. It has an albedo of 0.26, according to observations made by the Wide-field Infrared Survey Explorer and subsequent NEOWISE mission. The body has a rotation period between 5.254 and 5.258 hours and a brightness variation between 0.09 and 0.63 magnitude.

Naming 

This minor planet was named in honor of Carl Sagan (1934–1996), planetary scientist at Cornell University, science popularizer, editor of the journal Icarus, and founder of The Planetary Society. Sagan participated on a number of planetary space missions, including the Voyager mission to the outer planets and the Mariner 9 and Viking program to Mars.

Sagan's research encompassed studies of the greenhouse effect on Venus, the atmosphere and surface of Titan, windblown dust on Mars, and the possibility of extraterrestrial intelligent life. Sagan won the Pulitzer Prize for literature in 1978. The official naming citation was published by the Minor Planet Center on 4 August 1982.

An asteroid discovered in 1998, 4970 Druyan, is named after Sagan's wife Ann Druyan and is said to be in a "wedding ring orbit" with respect to 2709 Sagan.

Notes

References

External links 
 Asteroid Lightcurve Database (LCDB), query form (info )
 Schmadel, Lutz D.; Dictionary of Minor Planet Names, Google books
 Behrend, Raoul; Asteroids and comets rotation curves, CdR – Observatoire de Genève
 Discovery Circumstances: Numbered Minor Planets (1)-(5000) – Minor Planet Center
 
 

002709
Discoveries by Edward L. G. Bowell
Named minor planets
2709 Sagan
002709
19820321